Richard Bruce Hunter (July 6, 1939 – July 6, 2018) was an American competition swimmer who represented the United States at the 1960 Summer Olympics in Rome.  Hunter swam in the men's 100-meter freestyle, advanced to the finals, and finished fourth overall with a time of 55.6 seconds.  He would earn an MBA from Harvard Business School in 1974.

See also
 List of Harvard University people

References

1939 births
2018 deaths
American male freestyle swimmers
Harvard Crimson men's swimmers
Olympic swimmers of the United States
Sportspeople from Boston
Swimmers at the 1960 Summer Olympics
Harvard Business School alumni